The Alsea are a Native American tribe of Oregon. Alsea may also refer to:

Alsea (company), a Mexican restaurant business
Alsea Bay, a body of water near the city of Waldport, Oregon
Alsea Bay Bridge, a bridge near Waldport
Alsea, Oregon, an unincorporated community in Oregon
Alsea River, a river in Oregon
Alsean languages, a language family spoken along the Oregon Coast
USS Alsea (ATF-97), an Abnaki-class fleet ocean tug